Giles Bonnet (born February 10, 1965) is a South African field hockey coach. At the 2012 Summer Olympics he coached the South Africa women's national field hockey team. Currently he resides in The Netherlands, however he is originally from Durban, South Africa.

References

External links 
 

Living people
South African field hockey coaches
1965 births